Vyacheslav Muravyev (born 14 July 1982) is a Kazakhstani sprinter who specializes in the 100 and 200 metres.

He competed in the 60 metres at the 2006 World Indoor Championships, and finished eighth in the 100 metres at the 2006 Asian Games. He then competed in the 200 metres event at the 2008 Olympic Games and 2012 Olympic Games without reaching the final round.

His personal best 100 metres time is 10.33 seconds, achieved in May 2012 in Almaty. He has 20.63 seconds in the 200 metres, achieved in May 2012 also in Almaty; and 6.67 seconds in the 60 metres, achieved in February 2006 in Pattaya.

Competition record

References

1982 births
Living people
Kazakhstani male sprinters
Athletes (track and field) at the 2008 Summer Olympics
Athletes (track and field) at the 2012 Summer Olympics
Olympic athletes of Kazakhstan
Kazakhstani people of Russian descent
Athletes (track and field) at the 2006 Asian Games
Athletes (track and field) at the 2010 Asian Games
Asian Games competitors for Kazakhstan